Paramotor Performance AB is a Swedish aircraft manufacturer based in Bandhagen, near Stockholm. The company specializes in the design and manufacture of paramotors in the form of ready-to-fly aircraft for the US FAR 103 Ultralight Vehicles rules and the European microlight category.

The company was founded before 1998 and remained in business through 2021, although its website had been removed by early 2022 and the company may no longer exist.

Paramotor Performance AB is an Aktiebolag, a Swedish limited company.

The company has produced a number of paramotor designs noted for the quality of their metalwork, their attention to detail and their multi-bladed, composite, propeller designs.

Aircraft

References

External links

Aircraft manufacturers of Sweden
Ultralight aircraft
Paramotors